is a 2019 Japanese film adaptation of a manga series of the same name by Homura Kawamoto and Tōru Naomura. It is directed by Tsutomu Hanabusa, distributed by GAGA Pictures, and stars Minami Hamabe and Mahiro Takasugi as Yumeko Jabami and Ryota Suzui, respectively. It was released in Japan on May 3, 2019.

Plot
Hyakkaou Private Academy is a prestigious institution for the privileged, and was first established 122 years ago. The students there are ranked by their gambling winnings. The winners receive everything including fame and fortune. The winners also dominate the losers. One day, transfer student Yumeko Jabami arrives at the academy, quickly showing she is a gambling maniac who loves high stakes.

Cast

Reception
According to the Japan Times the "production values are high: The film's high school resembles a casino for high rollers in a 007 and a political flick." It also called the tone "more comically ironic than melodramatically overwrought."

Kakegurui grossed $2.6 million at the box office.

References

External links
 
  

2019 films
2019 action thriller films
2019 crime action films
2010s high school films
2019 crime thriller films
Japanese films about revenge
Films about terrorism in Asia
Films set in Japan
Gangs in fiction
Films about gambling
2010s Japanese-language films
Japanese action films
Japanese crime films
Japanese drama films
Japanese high school films
Japanese thriller films
Live-action films based on manga
Mafia films
2019 action drama films
2019 crime drama films
2019 thriller drama films
2010s Japanese films